A march supporting the refugees started on April 30th at Vintimille in southern France, at the Italian border. It will reach London, in the UK, on July 8th, after covering 1400 km in more than 2 months. The route follows that the refugees do, trying to reach the UK from southern Europe. The march is supported by many organisations.
Among the participants are José Bové, member of the European parliament, et Cédric Herrou, farmer, facing a court case for supporting "illegal immigrants".
At the beginning, one minute of silence was observed in memory of the 17 refugees who died trying to cross the French-Italian border since June 2015.
This takes place one week after the vote of a new law restricting again the right of asylum for refugees, and after the tentative of blocking the border by a group of extreme-right activists. The court refused to act against these activists, while people helping refugees in need have to face legal problems. Were also present Marie-Christine Vergiat, member of the European parliament, Alexis HK, singer, and Mgr Jacques Gaillot, catholic bishop.

References

External links 
 L'Auberge des migrants
 La Roya citoyenne

Protests in France
Left-wing activism in France